Microphysogobio yaluensis is a species of cyprinid fish endemic to the Korean peninsula.

References

Cyprinid fish of Asia
Fish described in 1928
Microphysogobio